The canton of Armagnac-Ténarèze is an administrative division of the Gers department, southwestern France. It was created at the French canton reorganisation which came into effect in March 2015. Its seat is in Eauze.

It consists of the following communes:
 
Beaumont
Bretagne-d'Armagnac
Castelnau-d'Auzan-Labarrère
Cassaigne
Cazeneuve
Eauze
Fourcès
Gondrin
Lagraulet-du-Gers
Larressingle
Larroque-sur-l'Osse
Lauraët
Mansencôme
Montréal
Mouchan

References

Cantons of Gers